Travis Tyrell Beckum (born January 24, 1987) is a former American football tight end. He was drafted by the New York Giants in the third round of the 2009 NFL Draft. He played college football at Wisconsin.

Early years
Travis Beckum played football for Oak Creek High School. He participated in the 2005 U.S. Army All-American Bowl where he was the leading tackler.

College career
In 2005, Beckum saw limited action in 10 games as reserve on defense and on special teams. The following year Beckum switched to the tight end position and saw more action. Beckum was a semifinalist for the John Mackey Award and was named second-team All-American by Walter Camp and SI.com. He caught 61 passes for 903 yards and 5 scores as a sophomore, and improved to 75, 982 and 6 as a junior. He was at his best in the biggest games, totaling 10 catches and 132 yards in a shootout against Michigan St, 11 for 160 at rival Illinois, and 9 for 140 at Ohio St.

On October 26, 2008, Beckum broke his leg in a 27-17 win over Illinois, ending his senior season. He finished with just 23 catches and 264 yards as a senior, but is regarded as one of the best at his position in Wisconsin history.

Professional career

New York Giants
Beckum was drafted by the New York Giants in the third round as the 100th overall pick of the 2009 NFL Draft.
In his rookie year, Beckum started 2 games out 15 played and had 8 receptions for 55 yards. The next year, 2010, he played in all 16 games, starting in 2, and had 13 receptions and a total of 116 yards and 2 touchdowns. Beckum caught 5 passes for 93 yards (18.6 yards per catch) and one touchdown as a backup tight end to Jake Ballard in 2011. During Super Bowl XLVI, Beckum tore his ACL. Despite his injury, the Giants won Super Bowl XLVI against the New England Patriots 21-17.

On August 27, 2012, Beckum was placed on the physically unable to perform list. On November 3, Beckum was activated after Mitch Petrus was released.

Seattle Seahawks
Beckum signed with the Seattle Seahawks on February 10, 2014.

On May 19, 2014, the Seattle Seahawks released Beckum along with Jimmy Legree to make room on the 90 man roster.

New Orleans Saints
Beckum signed with the New Orleans Saints on August 13, 2014. The Saints released Beckum on August 26, 2014.

Statistics
Source:

References

1987 births
Living people
Players of American football from Milwaukee
American football tight ends
Wisconsin Badgers football players
New York Giants players
Seattle Seahawks players
New Orleans Saints players